Once Bitten is the third studio album by American glam metal band Great White. It was released on June 17, 1987, by Capitol Records. The album became a commercial success, selling more than one million copies and being certified Platinum in April 1988. The anthem "Rock Me" became a hit single, charting in September 1987, and is one of Great White's best known songs. AllMusic explains in their review that it brought Great White a broader audience. "Save Your Love" also charted, becoming their most famous power ballad at the time, in February 1988. "Lady Red Light" and "All Over Now" would become fan favorites and be included among 15 tracks on their later retrospective, "Absolute Hits". It was the band's last album to feature bassist Lorne Black.

In the UK, the track listing was strangely altered, losing four new tracks and replacing them with songs from 1986 album Shot in the Dark and with a live version of "What Do You Do". The album's opening track, "Lady Red Light", was featured on the NBC show Parks and Recreation in the episode "Tom's Divorce". The model photographed on the cover is Tracy Martinson.

Legacy 
In 2017, Jack Russell's Great White celebrated Once Bittens anniversary by announcing a tour and an acoustic re-recording of the album. The acoustic version, "Once Bitten Acoustic Bytes", was released in 2020.

Track listing

UK edition track listing 
Side one
"Lady Red Light"
"Gonna Getcha"
"Rock Me"
"All Over Now"

Side two
"Fast Road"
"What Do You Do" (live)
"Face the Day" (US Radio Blues Version)
"Gimme Some Lovin'"

International alternate track listing 
Side one
"Lady Red Light"
"Gonna Getcha"
"Fast Road"
"Mistreater"
"All Over Now"
Side two
"Never Change Heart"
"Rock Me"
"On the Edge"
"Save Your Love"

Personnel

Great White 
Jack Russell – lead and backing vocals
Mark Kendall – lead guitar, backing vocals
Michael Lardie – rhythm guitar, keyboards, harmonica, backing vocals
Lorne Black – bass, backing vocals
Audie Desbrow – drums

Production 
Arranged and produced by Alan Niven, Michael Lardie and Mark Kendall
Engineered by Michael Lardie and Eddie Ashworth
Mastered by George Marino

Charts

Album

Singles

Rock Me

Save Your Love

Lady Red Light

Certifications

References 

1987 albums
Capitol Records albums
Great White albums